Roundtop Mountain may refer to the following mountains:

 Roundtop Mountain (Alaska)
 Roundtop Mountain (Greene County, New York)
 Roundtop Mountain (Ulster County, New York)
 Roundtop Mountain (Warren County, New York)

See also
 Round Top Mountain
 Round Top (disambiguation)